Russian Roulette: The Inside Story of Putin's War on America and the Election of Donald Trump is a 2018 book by journalists Michael Isikoff and David Corn. It details their findings on Russian interference in the 2016 United States elections.

References

External links 
 Publisher's website

2018 non-fiction books
Books about Donald Trump
Books about the 2016 United States presidential election
Books about Vladimir Putin
Collaborative non-fiction books
Books about Russian interference in the 2016 United States elections
Twelve (publisher) books